The Union Mondiale des Écrivains Médecins (UMEM) is a literary organization that brings medical writers around the world.

It was established in 1955 under the name Fédération Internationale des Sociétés des Medecins Écrivains (FISEM), only using its current name in 1973 in Warsaw on the occasion of its congress held that year.

When was FISEM, only few countries (France, Italy, Switzerland and Belgium) entities owned national medical writers.

Purpose 

The UMEM aims to allow its members a better understanding among all, establishing ties of friendship and understanding among medical writers of different nationalities, fostering their literary activity and helping to disseminate their work.

External links 
 Institutional site

 UMEM
Writers' organizations